Maribyrnong College, also known as Maribyrnong Secondary College, and formerly known as Maribyrnong High School, is a government-funded secondary day school that specialises in sports, located in Maribyrnong in the inner western suburbs of Melbourne, Victoria, Australia. Students enrol based on local residence and/or in the selective sports academy. The school offers an accelerated learning program to prospective students who demonstrate academic ability.

It is located on River Street, Maribyrnong (formerly Maidstone until this part of Maidstone was rezoned in the 1990s). Founded in 1958, as Maribyrnong High School, a state-of-the-art sports complex opened on 22 June 2010.

History 

The college has a long history in the suburbs of Maidstone and Maribyrnong as it was established in 1958.

Maribyrnong had a special place in terms of multicultural history among Melbourne's high schools. Being so close to the Maribyrnong Migrant Hostel (now closed) the school had an integration program for children from the hostel who were from all around the world, including many refugees.

Specialist Sport Program 
In 2005 the school commenced its "Specialist Sport Program" with selective entry for talented sports students. Enrollments have grown: in 2007 there were 56 Specialist Sport students from a total school enrollment of 380; in 2010 there were 450 students involved in the sports program from a total school enrollment of 900. Several sports receive a major focus: Australian rules football, basketball, soccer, swimming and tennis. The school has extensive partnerships with the Western Bulldogs, Victorian Institute of Sport, Australian Institute of Sport and Victoria University.

Buildings and Facilities 
Maribyrnong College has one campus that is divided into 5 building blocks. They are: the P block, the A block, the B block, the C block and the M block. 

The M block, the newest addition to the school, was completed in 2019 and sought to remove the relocatable classrooms once used. It serves as a Victorian Certificate of Education student centre, accompanying the VCE study hall. Several extra-curricular workshops and kitchen-hybrid rooms are used by the general school population. In total, the College boasts over 50 classroom environments, a 230-seat theatre and its 7000 square metre Sport Stadium with classrooms for Health and Physical Education.

Sports Stadium 
The Sports Stadium which opened on 22 June 2010 includes two basketball-netball courts, six badminton courts, a  sprint track and a full size gym. It was officially opened by the Premier of Victoria, John Brumby.
The school is still adding extra features to the facility.

Transport 
Tram 82 (Footscray - Moonee Ponds) stops right in front of the school on River Street. Bus services to Highpoint Shopping Centre also provide close public transport to the school. The Maribyrnong River is only a short walk from the college and the Maribyrnong River Trail can be used by students to commute to school.

Notable alumni

Rory Atkins, AFL footballer for the Adelaide Football Club
Zak Butters, AFL footballer for the Port Adelaide Football Club
Jack Bytel-AFL footballer for the St Kilda Football Club
Doug Chappel, comedian
Tony Dodemaide, cricketer for the Australian national team
Kerry Greenwood, author and lawyer
Mary Leunig, cartoonist, artist and activist
Michael Leunig, cartoonist
Touk Miller, AFL footballer for the Gold Coast Football Club
Mark Philippoussis, world-ranked professional tennis player who was runner-up 1998 US Open
Luke Ryan, AFL footballer for the Fremantle Football Club
Joel Smith, AFL footballer for the Melbourne Football Club
Kayne Turner, AFL footballer for the North Melbourne Football Club
Guy Walker, cricketer for the Melbourne Renegades, and AFL footballer for the Melbourne Football Club
Peter Wright, AFL footballer for the Gold Coast Football Club
Monique Conti- AFLW player/basketballer
Georgia Patrikios-AFLW footballer
Buku Khamis- AFL Footballer
Emerson Jeka- AFL Footballer
Ellie McKenzie-AFLW Footballer
Jess Fitzgerald - AFLW Footballer
Georgie Prespakis-AFLW footballer
Aliesha Newman-AFLW footballer
Libby Birch-AFLW player

References

External links

 Maribyrnong College website

Public high schools in Melbourne
Maribyrnong, Victoria
1958 establishments in Australia
Educational institutions established in 1958
Sports schools in Australia
Buildings and structures in the City of Maribyrnong